Time Lord is a side-scrolling action-platform video game developed by Rare and published by Milton Bradley Company for the Nintendo Entertainment System. It was released in North America in September 1990 and in Europe in 1991.

Plot
In the year 2999, Earth is under siege by aliens from the planet Drakkon. Using time travel technology, they have sent armies to four periods in human history, with the intention of altering history to make humankind easier to conquer in the present. The player assumes control of the "Time Lord", who has until January 1, 3000 AD to vanquish the enemy in the past, or else, he will self-destruct along with the time machine.

Gameplay

The player begins in the MB Time Travel Research Centre, then progresses through four levels based on periods in human history (Medieval England 1250 AD, Western United States 1860 AD, Caribbean 1650 AD, and France 1943 AD). After the Drakkon forces have been eliminated, the player returns to the present to do battle with the Drakkon King.

The game features oblique graphics to simulate 3D terrain. The Time Lord can jump, punch, and use period weapons such as swords and guns. To progress from level to level, the player must acquire five golden orbs with which to power the time machine. In the era levels, four of the five orbs are scattered throughout each level, with the fifth being relinquished after defeating a Drakkon Lord (boss).

The aforementioned year 3000 deadline is in effect in game. One day in present time transpires in six seconds, meaning the player has 36 minutes and 30 seconds of gameplay time to complete the game or the game is lost. The time limit remains in effect even when the player has returned to the present.

The player is not granted any continues but may obtain extra lives. Depending on the time period the player is in, weapons such as swords, throwing knives, firearms, grenades, and laser weaponry can be used. The player begins each level unarmed, but can acquire these weapons by collecting giftwrapped packages.

Reception

Allgame's Christopher Michael Baker was critical of Time Lord. He referred to the gameplay as dull and repetitive, citing that most people would not have the patience to finish the game.

References

1990 video games
Milton Bradley Company video games
Nintendo Entertainment System games
Nintendo Entertainment System-only games
Platform games
Rare (company) games
Single-player video games
Video games about time travel
Video games developed in the United Kingdom
Video games scored by David Wise
Video games with oblique graphics